Ecoauthoritarianism, short for ecological authoritarianism, is a political thought arguing for the inevitability and necessity of measures that defy democracy and even commonly accepted human rights in general. The common denominator in ecoauthoritarian thought is the focus on sustainability and the belief that democracy cannot secure survival. Though other regime types are imaginable, the majority of scholars suggest a meritocratic system, although some have suggested a climate dictatorship. Instead of a democratic rule, politicians would be chosen according to their expertise. Democratic will would be replaced by policies guided by science and ecological necessity.

Within green political thought, ecoauthoritarianism is marginal. Ecoauthoritarianism was inspired by The Limits to Growth and its conclusion that there are physical limits to growth and that without dramatic changes in all areas of life, Earth is doomed to become uninhabitable. Newer ecoauthoritarian thought underlines the tradeoffs and lack of legitimacy of unsustainable politics in a democracy.  It emphasizes that democracy cannot be an absolute, since sustainability is a precondition for everything valuable. It shows how the overexploitation of resources, given its consequences, must be considered as violence and that in fact, many issues cannot be subject to democratic decision making nor should they be subject to democratic decision making. There are many instances where the state already interferes and where interference is essential for public safety.

Ecoauthoritarian thoughts are gaining traction recently, as some people believe democracy is an inadequate system to ensure ecological stability. As problems such as climate change continue to remain unaddressed at a global scale, voices asking for stricter measures are likely to grow louder. Especially, the recent leaps taken by the Chinese government are seen by some scholars as evidence for the superior potential of autocratic governments when it comes to implementing good environmental governance.

See also 
 Deep ecology
 Ecofascism
 Eco-nationalism
 Green Imperialism

References 

Authoritarianism
Political ecology
Green politics
Environmentalism
Ecological economics
Population ecology